Avarzaman (also Romanized as Āvarzamān and Arūzamān; also known as Āb-ī-Zamān, Āb Zamām, Āvar Zamān Tappeh Qayelī, and Avzamān) is a village in Avarzaman Rural District, Samen District, Malayer County, Hamadan Province, Iran. At the 2006 census, its population was 1,881, in 550 families.

References 

Populated places in Malayer County